Nebeski odred is a 1961 Yugoslav drama film directed by Bosko Boskovic and Ilija Nikolic. It was entered into the 2nd Moscow International Film Festival.

Cast
 Ljuba Tadic
 Branko Tatic
 Ljubisa Stojcevic
 Vitomir Ljubicic

References

External links
 

1961 films
1961 drama films
Serbian-language films
Serbian drama films
Yugoslav drama films